Scotargus is a genus of sheet weavers that was first described by Eugène Louis Simon in 1913.

Species
 it contains six species, found in Europe, Algeria, North Africa, and on the Canary Islands:
Scotargus enghoffi Wunderlich, 1992 – Canary Is.
Scotargus grancanariensis Wunderlich, 1992 – Canary Is.
Scotargus numidicus Bosmans, 2006 – Algeria
Scotargus pilosus Simon, 1913 (type) – Europe, North Africa, Caucasus, Russia to Central Asia
Scotargus secundus Wunderlich, 1987 – Canary Is.
Scotargus tenerifensis Wunderlich, 1992 – Canary Is.

See also
 List of Linyphiidae species (Q–Z)

References

Araneomorphae genera
Linyphiidae
Palearctic spiders
Spiders of Africa
Spiders of the Canary Islands